Edward José Mujica (born May 10, 1984) is a Venezuelan former professional baseball pitcher. He played in Major League Baseball (MLB) for the Cleveland Indians, San Diego Padres, Florida/Miami Marlins, St. Louis Cardinals, Boston Red Sox, Oakland Athletics and Detroit Tigers.

Career

Cleveland Indians
Mujica originally signed with the Indians as an undrafted free agent in October, 2001. He quickly became one of the top pitching prospects in the Cleveland organization.

Mujica began his career as a starter with San Felipe, Burlington and Lake County in 2002, 2003, and 2004. He became a full-time reliever in 2005, and dominated the Carolina League as the closer with the Kinston Indians, earning a 2.08 ERA, 14 saves, 32 strikeouts and just two walks in 26 innings before being promoted to Double-A Akron. He continued his dominance with the Aeros, going 2–1 with 10 saves, a 2.88 ERA, 33 strikeouts, and only five walks in  innings.

Mujica began 2006 in Akron, where he recorded eight saves without surrendering an earned run, 17 strikeouts, and nine walks in 19 innings before getting promoted to Triple-A Buffalo. For Buffalo, he was 3–1 with five saves, a 2.48 ERA, 29 strikeouts, and five walks in  innings. He made his major league debut with Cleveland on June 21, .

San Diego Padres
On April 1, 2009, Mujica was traded to the San Diego Padres for future considerations.

Mujica was awarded the win in the first ever regular season game at Citi Field against the New York Mets on April 13, 2009.

Florida/Miami Marlins
Following the 2010 season, Mujica was traded with Ryan Webb to the Marlins for Cameron Maybin.

In 2011, Mujica appeared in 67 games, finished with a 9-6 record, had 63 strikeouts and an ERA of 2.96.

On June 30, 2012, Mujica was placed on the 15-day disabled list after a line drive from opponent Plácido Polanco struck the fifth toe on his right foot; X-rays confirmed a fractured toe.

St. Louis Cardinals
On July 31, 2012, Mujica was traded to the St. Louis Cardinals for minor league third baseman Zack Cox. He was used primarily in the 7th inning of games for the team. In 2013, when the Cardinals closer Jason Motte was injured and set-up man Mitchell Boggs lost his effectiveness, Mujica became the new closer (around mid-April) and began collecting  saves in his new role. On July 14, 2013, it was confirmed that Mujica would replace fellow Cardinal Adam Wainwright in the 2013 All Star Game, who had pitched two nights before against the Chicago Cubs. It was Mujica's first All Star Game appearance of his career. He was not called on to pitch, however. He became a free agent after the 2013 World Series on October 31, 2013.

Boston Red Sox

On December 5, 2013, Mujica agreed to a two-year, $9.5 million contract with the Boston Red Sox, pending the completion of a physical examination. The contract became official on December 7. He was designated for assignment by Boston on May 8, 2015.

Oakland Athletics
On May 9, 2015, he was traded to the Oakland Athletics in exchange for a player to be named later or cash.

Philadelphia Phillies
On December 17, 2015, Mujica signed a minor league contract with the Philadelphia Phillies, receiving an invitation to spring training. He was released on March 29, 2016 and re-signed a day later. He was released on July 14 after requesting his release. He posted an ERA of 3.69 in 39 innings at the AAA level.

Kansas City Royals
On July 15, 2016, Mujica signed a minor league contract with the Kansas City Royals. He was released on August 10.

Minnesota Twins
On August 19, 2016, Mujica signed a minor league contract with the Minnesota Twins. On August 20, he was assigned to AAA Rochester.

Detroit Tigers
On January 10, 2017, Mujica signed a minor league contract with the Detroit Tigers that included an invitation to spring training. On August 3, he was recalled from the Toledo Mud Hens by Detroit to replace Michael Fulmer, who was placed on the 10-day disabled list. At the time of his recall, Mujica had appeared in 46 games for Toledo, posting a 1–1 record, 12 saves, and a 2.35 ERA in 46 innings. On August 13, 2017, the Tigers designated Mujica for assignment.

Second stint in St. Louis
On January 31, 2018, Mujica signed a minor league contract to return to the St. Louis Cardinals. He became a free agent after the season ended.

Leones de Yucatan
Mujica spent the 2019 season with the Leones de Yucatan of the Mexican Baseball League and he became a free agent after the season.

Pitching style
Mujica is mainly a two-pitch pitcher, utilizing a four-seam fastball at 90-93 mph and a splitter at 86-89. He also has a two-seam fastball in the same velocity range as his four-seamer, and a slider in the low 80s. Lefties see a very heavy diet of splitters; in 2011, they constituted more than half of the pitches he threw to left-handers. Right-handed hitters tend to see a greater assortment of pitches, including the slider (which Mujica rarely uses against lefties).

See also

 List of Major League Baseball players from Venezuela

References

External links

1984 births
Living people
Akron Aeros players
Boston Red Sox players
Buffalo Bisons (minor league) players
Burlington Indians players (1986–2006)
Caribes de Anzoátegui players
Caribes de Oriente players
Cleveland Indians players
Detroit Tigers players
Florida Marlins players
Jupiter Hammerheads players
Kinston Indians players
Lake County Captains players
Lehigh Valley IronPigs players
Major League Baseball pitchers
Major League Baseball players from Venezuela
Memphis Redbirds players
Miami Marlins players
National League All-Stars
Navegantes del Magallanes players
Oakland Athletics players
Omaha Storm Chasers players
Rochester Red Wings players
San Diego Padres players
Sportspeople from Valencia, Venezuela
St. Louis Cardinals players
Toledo Mud Hens players
Venezuelan expatriate baseball players in the United States